Lecture bottles are small compressed gas cylinders, typically  long and  in diameter. They are used in laboratories working with small quantities of gases or specialty gases. They are not refillable and are expensive to dispose of.

References

Laboratory equipment
Industrial gases